WLEP-LD, virtual channel 9 (UHF digital channel 43), was a low-powered television station licensed to Erie, Pennsylvania, United States. The station was owned by LocusPoint Networks.

History
The station was owned by KM Communications Inc., which sold the station to Hapa Media Properties, LLC in June 2009.  WLEP-LD first went on the air with channels 9.1 and 9.2 on February 18, 2011, and with 9.3 the next day. In 2015, the station was sold from Hapa Media Properties, LLC to LocusPoint Networks and quietly went dark. In 2016, WLEP-LD resumed broadcasting, becoming an affiliate of the Sonlife Broadcasting Network. As of February 12, 2019, the station has shut down and the license has been returned to the FCC.

Digital channel

References

External links

Low-power television stations in the United States
LEP-LD
Television channels and stations established in 2011
2011 establishments in Pennsylvania
Defunct television stations in the United States
Television channels and stations disestablished in 2019
2019 disestablishments in Pennsylvania
LEP-LD